The 1995 National Rowing Championships was the 24th edition of the National Championships, held from 14–16 July 1995 at the National Water Sports Centre in Holme Pierrepont, Nottingham. There was a new record entry of 741 crews.

Senior

Medal summary

Lightweight

Medal summary

Under-23

Medal summary

Junior

Medal summary

Coastal

Medal summary 

Key

References 

British Rowing Championships
British Rowing Championships
British Rowing Championships